"Put Yourself in My Shoes" is a song co-written and recorded by American country music singer Clint Black.  It was released in October 1990 as the lead single and title track to his second album Put Yourself in My Shoes.  The song made its chart debut in October 1990 and peaked at number 4 on Hot Country Singles & Tracks by year's end. In Canada, it peaked at number 3 on the RPM country music charts dated for December 15, 1990. It was written by Black with Hayden Nicholas and Shake Russell.

Music video
The music video was directed by Dean Lent, and premiered in October 1990. It features Black and his band performing the song at a barber shop.

Chart positions

Year-end charts

References

1990 singles
Clint Black songs
Songs written by Clint Black
Songs written by Hayden Nicholas
Song recordings produced by James Stroud
RCA Records Nashville singles
1990 songs